

Some notable broadcasters

A
Lee Allen (1945)

B
Roger Baker (1939–44)
Sam Balter (1942)
Red Barber (1934–38) [*]
Johnny Bench (1987–90)
Dick Bray (1937–44)
Jeff Brantley (2007–present) "The Cowboy"
Marty Brennaman (1974–2019) [*] ...and this one belongs to the Reds!
Thom Brennaman (1987–89, 2007–20)
Bill Brown (1976–82), now with the Houston Astros
C.O. "Oatmeal" Brown (1933)
George Bryson (1956–60)
Bob Burdette (1930)

C
Dick Carlson (1980–83)
Sean Casey (2011, 2013 fill-in)
Gordy Coleman (1990–93)
Ken Coleman (1975–79)

D
Jim Day (2000-present)

G
George Grande (1993–2009; fill-in 2010–2018)
Danny Graves (2018–2020)

H
Harry Hartman (1931–41)
Tom Hedrick (1971–72)
Dan Hoard (2000, 2003, 2009 fill-in)
Waite Hoyt (1942–65, 1972) There was the pitch!
Tom Hume (1990)

J
Charlie Jones (1973–74)

K
Paul Keels (2010)
Jim Kelch (2008–17)
Gene Kelly (1962–63)
Ed Kennedy (1961–70)

L
Steve LaMar (1990–92)
Ray Lane (1979–84)
Barry Larkin (2021–present)
Sam LeCure (2018–present)

M
Frank McCormick (1958–68)
Jim McIntyre (1966–70)
Kent Mercker (2009, fill-in)
Al Michaels (1971–73) She's gone!
Gene Mittendorf (1924)
Jack Moran (1955-61)
Joe Morgan (1985)

N
Dick Nesbitt (1942–44)
Joe Nuxhall (1967-2004; occasionally 2004–2007) This is the old left-hander, rounding third and heading for home.

P
Wes Parker (1973)
Steve Physioc (1986)

R
Jay Randolph (1988)
Pee Wee Reese (1969–70)

S
John Sadak (2021–present)
Mark Scott (1956)
Steve Stewart (2004-2006)
Claude Sullivan (1964–67)
Sidney Ten-Eyck (1930–33)

T
Tommy Thrall (2018–present)

W
Bob Waller (1971)
Chris Welsh (1994–present) "The Crafty Left-Hander"
Ken Wilson  (1983–85)
Woody Woodward (1974–75)

[*] Ford C. Frick Award

Source: Reds 2002 Media Guide

Radio Broadcast Stations
Games were broadcast intermittently in the 1920s. From 1933 to 1945, broadcasts were shared among multiple stations.

WFBE/WCPO: 1933–1942, 1945–54
WSAI: 1933–1944, 1955–56
WKRC: 1924 (as WMH), 1934–35, 1942–44, 1957–63
WCKY: 1964-69
WLW: 1929, 1969–present

Television Broadcast Stations
WLWT, 1948-1995
Sports Time, 1984
WSTR-TV, 1996-1998
WKRC-TV, 1999, 2010-Current (Reds Opening Day only, simulcasted by Fox Sports Ohio)
SportsChannel Ohio/Fox Sports Ohio/Bally Sports Ohio, 1991–present

2022 season lineups
Radio: 

 Play-by-play: Tommy Thrall

 Analyst: Jeff Brantley, Chris Welsh

TV: 
 Play-by-play: John Sadak, Jim Day
 Analyst: Barry Larkin, Chris Welsh, Jeff Brantley
 Pre- and post-game: Brian Giesenschlag, Annie Sabo, Sam LeCure
 Sideline: Jim Day

See also
 List of current Major League Baseball announcers

 
Cincinnati Reds
Broadcasters
SportsChannel
Fox Sports Networks
Bally Sports